Uptonia is an extinct ammonite from the Lower Jurassic that's included in the eoderoceratoidean family Polymorphitidae.

The shell of Uptonia is evolute with rounded simple ribs that form strong chevrons as they cross the venter on the outer rim, and which are free of tubercles. Some grew to be fairly large. The suture is ammonitic, complex, with large lateral lobes

Distribution 
Fossils of Uptonia have been found in Argentina, Canada (British Columbia), France, Germany, Greenland, Hungary, the Russian Federation, Spain, Turkey, and the United Kingdom.

References

Further reading 
 Arkell, et al. 1957. Mesozoic Ammonoidea. Treatise on Invertebrate Paleontology, Part L. Geol Soc of America and Univ Kansas Press. R.C. Moore Ed.

External links 
 Uptonia ignota Photos
 Uptonia  Taxonomy

Ammonitida genera
Eoderoceratoidea
Early Jurassic ammonites of Europe
Ammonites of Europe
Ammonites of North America
Jurassic Canada
Ammonites of South America
Jurassic Argentina
Pliensbachian life
Hasle Formation